Diving was first introduced in the official programme of the Summer Olympic Games at the 1904 Games of St. Louis and has been an Olympic sport since. It was known as "fancy diving" for the acrobatic stunts performed by divers during the dive (such as somersaults and twists). This discipline of Aquatics, along with swimming, synchronised swimming and water polo, is regulated and supervised by the International Swimming Federation (FINA), the international federation (IF) for aquatic sports.

Summary

History
The first Olympic diving events were contested by men and consisted of a platform diving event ("fancy high diving") and also a plunge for distance event, which heralded victorious the diver who could reach the farthest underwater, while remaining motionless after a ground-level standing dive. At the 1908 Summer Olympics, men's springboard diving was added to the program replacing the plunge for distance, regarded as uninteresting. Women's diving debut happened at the 1912 Summer Olympics in the platform event and was expanded to springboard diving at the 1920 Summer Olympics. A parallel platform diving event for men, called "plain high diving", was presented at the Games of the V Olympiad. No acrobatic moves were allowed, only a simple straight dive off the platform. It was last contested at the 1924 Summer Olympics after which it was merged with "fancy high diving" into one competition renamed "highboard diving" (or just "high diving").

By the time of the 1996 Summer Olympics, the diving events were exactly the same as in 1928 (2 men's and 2 women's events). However, four years later in Sydney, the inclusion of a synchronized diving variant for the springboard and platform events elevated the list up to eight events (4 men's and 4 women's events).

Another important change to the sport occurred at the 1984 Summer Olympics, when China first competed, after boycotting the previous games due to the political status of Taiwan. China has become the dominant diving power and accumulated 47 gold medals since 1984.

Medal table

Total medal count 1904–2020:

Events

Men's

Women's

Nations
The numbers in each cell indicate the number of divers that nation sent to that Games.

See also
List of Olympic venues in diving

Notes

References
 
 
 

 
Olympics
Sports at the Summer Olympics